Vindex is a Roman governor of Gaul (modern-day France).

Vindex may also refer to:

 Vindex Toys, toy division of the National Sewing Machine Company
 HMS Vindex, Royal Navy ships
 Ruellia vindex, plant species
 Asios vindex and Phanaeus vindex, beetle species
 Vindex, a community in Garret County, Maryland, USA
 Vindex, fictional character in the 2008 space opera Implied Spaces by Walter Jon Williams
 Julius Vindex, pseudonym of Irish political writer Denis Taaffe (1759-1813)
 Vindex, pen name of Giselher Wirsing, author of Stalinisme (1944)
 Vindex, a prophesied, antichrist-type figure in the Satanism of the Order of Nine Angles

See also
 Vindicator (disambiguation) (English for Latin vindex)
 Windex